Ko Min-sung (born 20 November 1995) is a South Korean footballer.

References

External links 
 

South Korean footballers
Association football midfielders
Living people
1995 births
Suwon Samsung Bluewings players
Gangwon FC players
Daejeon Hana Citizen FC players
K League 1 players
K League 2 players